Lake Edgar was a natural fault scarp pond on the upper reaches of the Huon River in South West Tasmania.

Description
The lake was eventually inundated when the Lake Pedder was flooded as part of a hydroelectric power scheme in 1972. Lake Edgar should not be confused with the Edgar pond which was created when the Edgar Dam intersected one of the smaller tributaries of Lake Edgar.

It was reactivated in the Quaternary. The fault passes through the west part of the Edgar Dam. This is the only fault known to have ruptured twice in the Quaternary period. The fault was discovered by Carey and Newstead in 1960. It cracks up Precambrian rocks in the Jubilee Element. The fault dammed up the water to form a lake. This was later split by partial draining. Lake Edgar is the southern of the two small lakes formed. Sediment would have rapidly filled the lake if it was old. The earthquakes associated with the formation of the uplifts would be of magnitude 6.6 to 7.

The fault separated graphitic phyllite in the east from metasiltstone, argillite, quartz sandstone conglomerate on the west. The Hydro Electric Commission dug a trench through the fault and dug pits to determine if water would leak through the fault when the Edgar Dam was built.

See also
Lake Pedder

List of reservoirs and dams in Tasmania
List of lakes in Tasmania

References

Edgar
Edgar, Lake
Edgar, Lake
Edgar